The 1977 Belmont Stakes was the 109th running of the Belmont Stakes at Belmont Park in Elmont, New York held on June 11, 1977. With a field of eight horses, Seattle Slew won by four lengths in front of a crowd of 70,229 spectators. In conjunction with previously winning the Kentucky Derby and Preakness Stakes, Seattle Slew became the tenth horse to with the Triple Crown of Thoroughbred Racing, and the first to do so unbeaten. The race went off at 5:47 pm ET and was televised on CBS nationwide.

Results 

Times:  mile: :24.6,  mile: :48.4, mile: 1:14, 1 mile: 1:38.8, 1mile: 2:03.8, Final: 2:29.6

Note: times were kept to the fifth of a second.

Payout schedule

See also 
 1977 Kentucky Derby
 1977 Preakness Stakes

References

External links 
 BelmontStakes.com
 1977 Belmont Stakes on YouTube

Belmont Stakes races
Belmont Stakes
Belmont Stakes
Belmont Stakes
Belmont Stakes